Tessa Biddington, (born 1954 in Pinner, north-west London) is a British poet.

Life
Biddington works as a freelance trainer, raising awareness about domestic violence.  She began writing in 1996.  Her poetry has appeared in The New Welsh Review.  In 2002, FAW! commissioned local poets Tessa Biddington and Keith Morgan; this work was featured on Forest of Dean Community Radio and performed at the Cheltenham Literature Festival.

Awards
 2000 Forward Poetry Prize for the best single poem The Death of Descartes
 Lantern Show, Scott Base, 2001 Ottakar's Faber National Poetry Competition

Work
 The Weight of Water, Like Starlings, Tess Biddington and Adam Burbage

Anthologies
 The Forward book of poetry 2001 (Forward Publishing), Forward Publishing, 2000

References

British poets
British women poets
1954 births
Living people